Tehran and Suburbs Bus Company is a public transport agency running transit buses in Tehran, Iran, and surrounding cities. It is also the operator of Tehran Bus Rapid Transit.

References

External links
 
 

Transport in Tehran
Tehran
1992 establishments in Iran